HMS Erne, pennant number U03, was a  sloop in the Royal Navy. She was laid down by Furness Shipbuilding at Haverton Hill-on-Tees, Co. Durham on 21 September 1939, launched on 5 August 1940 and commissioned on 3 April 1941. She was adopted by the district of Bootle, then in Lancashire, as part of Warship Week in 1942.

She took her name like others in her class from birds, in this case a white-tailed eagle, also known as the erne.

Service history

On 30 April 1941, while Erne was still at the builders yard (4 days after commissioning), a near miss during a German air attack caused heavy damage. Repairs took until June 1942.

On 29 August 1942, Erne, scuttled the Dutch merchant Zuiderkerk with depth charges. The  had torpedoed Zuiderkerk west-north-west of Lisbon, Portugal in position 40º20'N, 16º02'W. A torpedo had caused extensive flooding of the forward holds, which forced the 56 crew members and twelve passengers to abandon ship in the early morning.  picked up the survivors.

Fate

Erne was reduced to a drill ship on 4 June 1952 and renamed Wessex. In 1965 she was sold for scrap and arrived at Antwerp on 27 October 1965 where she was broken up.

Notes

Publications
 
 

 

Black Swan-class sloops
World War II sloops of the United Kingdom
Sloops of the United Kingdom
Ships built on the River Tees
1940 ships